Collide is the second full-length EP by British DJ and electronic dance music composer Andy Hunter°. It is the follow-up to his 2008 album Colour. Collide was released as an iTunes exclusive on 6 December 2010. It was eventually released to other digital retailers in the new year.

Track list

Reception 

Reception for the EP has been positive by both critics and fans. Brian Palmer of Stereo Subversion stated that, "Collide is on par with Hunter’s best and may even be his best release yet. It’s a blast to listen to and will make for a great way to close 2010 and bring in the New Year." Collide also peaked to #4 on the iTunes Dance chart.

References

External links 
 Andy Hunter Official Website
 Andy Hunter on MySpace
 Andy Hunter on FaceBook

2010 albums
Andy Hunter (DJ) albums